Berniece Iona Terry Hiser (April 6, 1908January 5, 1995) was an American writer and schoolteacher.

Life 
Berniece Iona Terry Hiser was born April 6, 1908 in Cow Creek, Kentucky, to Wilson Edgar Terry and Ruse Wilder. She has an undergraduate degree from Berea College and earned a master's degree from the University of Kentucky. She taught school for 22 years and then became a librarian.

At age 70, Hiser published Quare Do's in Appalachia:  East Kentucky Legends and Memorats (Pikeville, Kentucky: Pikeville College Press, 1978), a collection of folktales, ghost stories, and tales she collected. which was in its second printing by 1981. Many of the stories involve members of her family, including the tale of how her grandmother Sally Wilder Frost was named by Col. John Hunt Morgan. This book was reviewed by Appalachian Journal and Kentucky Folklore Record.

She also wrote a children's book, set in Kentucky during the American Civil War, The Adventure of Charlie and His Wheat-straw Hat: A Memorat illustrated by Mary Szilagyi (1986). which was reviewed by library journals and the media. Hister wrote about people and events in western Kentucky for the local newspapers.

Hiser lived in Walton, Kentucky, for many years before her death January 5, 1995. She was buried in Pleasant View Cemetery, beside Pleasant View Church, in Grant County, Kentucky. Her husband Ora Hiser, who died January 5, 1999, was later buried beside her.

Selected publications

References 

1908 births
1995 deaths
American book editors
American children's writers
People from Owsley County, Kentucky
People from Walton, Kentucky
Berea College alumni
Kentucky women writers
Kentucky women in education
20th-century American educators
20th-century American women writers
Schoolteachers from Kentucky
20th-century American women educators